Bagdad was a town established in 1848 on the south bank of the mouth of the Rio Grande, in Mexico. Because the town was inside the municipality of Matamoros, Tamaulipas, it was also known as the Port of Bagdad or the Port of Matamoros. It was officially declared non-existent in 1880.

History
During the American Civil War, the town allied with the Confederate States in its rebellion against the United States. One of the first appearances of Bagdad was found on a map entitled "Map of the Country Adjacent to the Left Bank of the Rio Grande Below Matamoros, 1847."

Today, nothing remains of the original settlement.

See also
Boca Chica Beach

References
 Graf. Brownsville Weekly Ranchero, June 15, 1867.
 Irby, James A. Backdoor at Bagdad. El Paso, Texas: Texas Western Press, The University of Texas at El Paso, 1977. 
 Kearney, Milo, and Anthony Knopp. Boom and Bust: The Historical Cycles of Matamoros and Brownsville. 1st ed. Austin, Texas: Eakin Press, 1991. 
 Lea, Tom. The King Ranch. Boston, Massachusetts: Little, Brown, 1957.
 McAllen Amberson, Mary M., James A. McAllen, and Margaret H. McAllen. I Would Rather Sleep in Texas. Austin, Texas: Texas State Historical Association, 2003. 
 New York Herald, July 29, 1865.
 Parisot, P. F. Reminiscences of a Texas Missionary. Austin, Texas: Johnson Bros. Printing Co., 1899. 
 Gonzalez Ramos, Manuel Humberto. Historia del puerto de Bagdad. Matamoros, Tamaulipas, Mexico: Cronista 7 Cartografo de la H., 2004.

External links
 
 Matamoros:. The Gateway to Mexico 

1848 establishments in Mexico
American Civil War by location
Foreign relations during the American Civil War
Matamoros, Tamaulipas
Populated places established in 1848
Second French intervention in Mexico
Populated places disestablished in 1880